The California state elections, November 2010 were held on November 2, 2010.

On a year marked by a strong Republican wave nationwide, the State of California elected Democrats to the state's top offices of Governor, Lieutenant Governor, State Controller, State Treasurer, Superintendent of Public Education, Insurance Commissioner and United States Senator. On November 24, 2010, the California Democratic Party set a record for winning every statewide elected office in California in a single election when the last outstanding race - the one for Attorney General - was decided in Kamala Harris's  favor. Because fellow Democrat Dianne Feinstein holds the other Senate seat that was not up for election in 2010, the Democrats held every statewide elected office in California beginning in 2011.

United States Senate

United States House of Representatives

Constitutional officers

Governor

Lieutenant Governor

Secretary of State

State Controller

State Treasurer

Attorney General

Insurance Commissioner

Superintendent of Public Instruction

Board of Equalization

District 1

District 2

District 3

District 4

Supreme Court

Chief Justice nomination

Associate Justices

State Senate

There are 40 seats in the State Senate, the upper house of California's bicameral State Legislature. Voters in the 20 even-numbered districts of the California State Senate will vote for their representatives.

State Assembly

Voters in all 80 of California's State Assembly districts voted for their representatives.

Statewide ballot propositions
The following propositions have been approved for the November ballot either through referral by the state legislature or by obtaining 433,971 signatures for proposed statutes and 694,354 signatures for constitutional amendments.

Proposition 18
This is a legislatively referred state statute that would authorize an $11.1 billion bond to upgrade California's water system. On August 9, 2010, the California Legislature postponed the vote on the proposition until 2012.

Proposition 19

This is a citizen-initiated state statute that would legalize up to 1 ounce of marijuana for persons 21 years or older and would allow local governments to regulate as well as tax the newly created cannabis market.

Proposition 20

This is a citizen-initiated constitutional amendment that would require the California Citizens Redistricting Commission to re-draw congressional district lines, in addition to its current job of drawing state senate district lines and state assembly district lines.

Proposition 21

This is a citizen-initiated state statute that would increase vehicle license fees by $18 a year to fund state parks. The initiative also removes current state park motor vehicle parking fees.

Proposition 22

This is a citizen-initiated constitutional amendment that would prevent the state government from taking certain funds, such as transportation funds, from the local governments.

Proposition 23

This is a citizen-initiated state statute that would suspend California's Global Warming Solutions Act until statewide unemployment falls below 5.5% for four consecutive quarters.

Proposition 24

This is a citizen-initiated state statute that would repeal three business tax breaks passed by the state legislature as part of negotiations of the 2008–10 California budget crisis.

Proposition 25

This is a citizen-initiated constitutional amendment that would allow state budgets to be passed by the state legislature by a simple majority instead of the current two-thirds requirement. The two-thirds majority for passing taxes would not change.

Proposition 26

This is a citizen-initiated constitutional amendment that would require voters to approve new state levies and charges by a two-thirds super majority, with some exceptions.

Proposition 27

This is a citizen-initiated constitutional amendment that would repeal Proposition 11, which established the Citizens Redistricting Commission.

See also
2010 California gubernatorial election
List of California ballot propositions
June 2010 California state elections
Political party strength in U.S. states
Political party strength in California
Elections in California
Districts in California

References

External links 
California Elections and Voter Information from the California Secretary of State
Candidates for California State Offices at Project Vote Smart
California Polls at Pollster.com
California at Rasmussen Reports
California Congressional Races in 2010 campaign finance data from OpenSecrets
California 2010 campaign finance data from Follow the Money
Elections 2010 at the San Jose Mercury News

 
California 11